The Company 3 TFCA Luminary Award, formerly the Clyde Gilmour Award is an annual award, presented at the discretion the Toronto Film Critics Association as a lifetime achievement award for distinguished contributions to the Canadian film industry. Named in memory of Canadian broadcaster Clyde Gilmour, who was posthumously honoured as the award's first recipient, the award honours achievements in any part of the Canadian film industry, including direction, production, criticism, broadcasting and film festival programming, that have helped to enrich the understanding and appreciation of film in Canada.

In recent years, the recipient has also been empowered to select an emerging filmmaker to a receive a "pay it forward" grant of $50,000 in post-production services toward the production of a forthcoming film.

Recipients

References

External links

Toronto Film Critics Association Awards